A declaration of faith is a phrase that is said by a member of any religion to show either to themselves, their God or other members of the religion their belief and faith in the religion. Notable declarations of faith include confirmation and adult baptism in Christianity, the Shahadah in Islam and the Shema Yisrael in Judaism.

There are numerous other declarations of faith, typically performed during religious rituals in many faiths. Often, the declaration of faith is led by the leader of the congregation and followers respond in kind.

See also
 Religious identity

Religious oaths
Religious belief and doctrine